The Treaty of Neuilly-sur-Seine required Bulgaria to cede various territories, after Bulgaria had been one of the Central Powers defeated in World War I. The treaty was signed on 27 November 1919 at Neuilly-sur-Seine, France.

The treaty required Bulgaria: 
to cede Western Thrace to the Entente (which awarded it to Greece at the San Remo conference) thereby cutting off Bulgaria's direct outlet to the Aegean Sea. 
to sign a convention on population exchange with Greece.
to return Dobruja, which according to the Treaty of Bucharest was partially ceded to Bulgaria and partially to the Central Powers (who later, on 25 September 1918, transferred this joint condominium to Bulgaria), to Romania, thus restoring the border set by the Treaty of Bucharest (1913).
to return property removed from the foreign territory occupied by Bulgarian forces to its rightful owners, or to make compensation. 
to reduce its army to 20,000 men.
to pay reparations of £100 million.
to recognize the existence of the Kingdom of Serbs, Croats and Slovenes.

The signing ceremony was held in Neuilly's town hall (hôtel de ville).

In Bulgaria, the results of the treaty are popularly known as the Second National Catastrophe. Bulgaria subsequently regained Southern Dobruja as a result of the Treaty of Craiova. During World War II, together with Nazi Germany, it temporarily reoccupied most of the other territories ceded under the treaty.

Territories ceded to the Kingdom of Serbs, Croats and Slovenes 
Four minor regions (historiographically referred to by Bulgarians as the Western Outlands) had been part of Bulgaria from its inception as a principality in 1878, except for the region around Strumitsa, which became part of Bulgaria in 1912. Bulgaria was internationally recognised as an independent country in 1908 and controlled these territories until 1919 when they were ceded to the Kingdom of the Serbs, Croats and Slovenes under the Treaty of Neuilly. The cession of the region was partly a compensation for the occupation of the southern and eastern part of Serbia by Bulgarian troops between 1915 and 1918, and was partly motivated by strategic reasons. The old political boundary between Bulgaria and Serbia followed a chain of high mountain ridges, whereas the new one gave significant military and strategic advantages to the Serbs: it dangerously exposed the Bulgarian capital of Sofia and significantly reduced the military threat to eastern Serbia in case of a Bulgarian invasion (see also Balkan Wars and World War I).

The Treaty of Neuilly was one of the series of treaties after World War I, which included the Treaty of Versailles, the Treaty of Saint-Germain, the Treaty of Trianon, and the Treaty of Sèvres, which were intended to diminish the military and political strength of the defeated members of the Central Powers. Some areas with a Bulgarian majority population (such as Bosilegrad and part of the Dimitrovgrad municipality) were ceded to Serbia (part of the Kingdom of Serbs, Croats and Slovenes).

Bulgarian sources claim that the treaty was intended to last for twenty years and that all the ceded territories should have been returned to Bulgaria in 1939, but that was not specified in the treaty.

Area and population

In Serbia, to which the term generally applies in Bulgaria, the territory ceded is split between the modern Serbian District of Pirot (municipality of Dimitrovgrad and smaller parts of the municipalities of Pirot and Babušnica) and District of Pčinja (municipality of Bosilegrad and a small part of the municipality of Surdulica). It also includes a small section along the Timok River in the municipality and District of Zaječar, composed by eight localities (seven populated by Romanians and one populated by Bulgarians).

In 1919, the area corresponded to the following parts of the Bulgarian okrugs: Kyustendil, Tzaribrod , Tran , Kula  and Vidin . Bulgarian sources claim that the Bulgarian population made 98% of the population in Bosilegrad and 95% of the population in Tzaribrod at the time. In the Yugoslav census of 1931, all South Slavs were simply counted as Yugoslavs (Serbs, Croats, Slovenes, Bulgarians) so a comparison could not be made. According to the last Census in Serbia from 2002, Bulgarians made 50% and 71% of population in Dimitrovgrad and Bosilegrad respectively.

See also
Bulgarian irredentism
Bulgarians in North Macedonia
Bulgarians in Serbia
List of treaties
Minority Treaties
Western Outlands

References

Further reading
 Borisova, Galina M. "Bulgaria, Greece and Britain's Policy 1919." Etudes Balkaniques (1983) 19#3 pp 77–91. 
 Buirette, O. "The treaties of Neuilly-sur-Seine (1919) and Sevres (1920), or the redefining of a new Balkan Europe." Bulgarian Historical Review-Revue Bulgare d'Histoire 3-4 (2001): 99–113.
 Chary, Frederick B. The history of Bulgaria (ABC-CLIO, 2011).
 Nestor, Stelios. "Greek Macedonia and the Convention of Neuilly (1919)," Balkan Studies (1962) 3#1 pp 169–184. Online Version.

External links
Text of the Treaty
 Map of Europe at time of Treaty of Neuilly  at omniatlas.com
 

Paris Peace Conference (1919–1920)
1919 in Bulgaria
Bulgaria–France relations
Bulgaria–Greece relations
Bulgaria–Italy relations
Bulgaria–Romania relations
Neuilly
Neuilly
Neuilly
Neuilly
Neuilly
Neuilly
Neuilly
Neuilly
Neuilly
Neuilly
Neuilly
Neuilly
Neuilly
Neuilly
Neuilly
Neuilly
Treaties of the Kingdom of Italy (1861–1946)
Neuilly
Neuilly
Neuilly
Neuilly
Neuilly
Neuilly
World War I treaties
Vardar Macedonia (1912–1918)
History of Western Thrace
Bulgaria–Greece border
Reparations
Greater Romania
November 1919 events
Treaties involving territorial changes
Anti-Bulgarian sentiment
Bulgaria–Serbia relations